Rugby São Carlos, is a Brazilian rugby team based in São Carlos, established in 2000.

History

The first rugby team in  São Carlos appeared in 1990, where some foreign fans of the sport arrived in the city. Finding new partners, they formed the first team called São Carlos Rugby Club. However, over the years interest fell and this team ceased to exist in the mid 1990s.

In 2000, again with the arrival of new fans of the sport in the city and some remnants of the first era, they created a new team now called the Rugby São Carlos, established as a sports association. The club has won the Campeonato Paulista do Interior, also known as Caipirão (state league) in 2006.
The Rugby São Carlos also contests rugby sevens and beach rugby tournaments.

Titles and awards 
 2019: Runner-up in VII Sanca Sevens 
 2018: Runner-up in VI Sanca Sevens 
 2018: Golden Medal in Jogos Regionais (representing São Carlos, seven-a-side) 
 2018: Champion in Copa Central 
 2018: Conde do Pinhal Bowl  
 2017: Champion in V Sanca Sevens 
 2017: Champion in Copa Sevens 
 2016: Runner-up in IV Sanca Sevens 
 2016: Champion in Pira Sevens 
 2016: Champion in Paulista B 
 2016: Conde do Pinhal Bowl  
 2015: Runner-up in III Sanca Sevens 
 2015: Champion in II Rio Claro Sevens 
 2014: Shield Cup in XXII SPAC Lions 
 2014: Runner-up in II Sanca Sevens 
 2014: Champion in Paulista de Acesso 
 2013: Bowl Cup in XXI SPAC Lions 
 2013: Champion in I Sanca Sevens 
 2013: Champion in Copa Central de Rugby 
 2012: Bronze medal in Jogos Abertos do Interior (representing São Carlos, seven-a-side) 
 2011: Gold medal in Jogos Abertos do Interior (representing São Carlos, seven-a-side) 
 2008: Runner-up in Campeonato Paulista de Rugby do Interior 
 2006: Champion in Campeonato Paulista de Rugby do Interior 
 2005: Runner-up in Campeonato Paulista de Rugby do Interior 
 2005: Runner-up in I Copa Campinas de Rugby (ten-a-side)

Categories
The club also runs youth teams.

Sao Carlos
Brazilian rugby union teams
Rugby union teams in São Paulo (state)